Harriet Williamson is a British journalist. She writes about feminism, politics, sexuality, mental health, and other topics.  Williamson has contributed to many news and opinion outlets, among them Foreign Policy, Metro UK, the New Statesman and The Independent.   Williamson was diagnosed with borderline personality disorder, a topic she discusses and writes about.

References

Year of birth missing (living people)
Living people
British women journalists
People with borderline personality disorder